Middlesbrough Women Football Club is an English women's football club.

Middlesbrough also have a reserve side competing in the FA Women's National League Reserve Northern Division. Their home games are played at Middlesbrough College.

History

Formation and early years (1976–2010)
Middlesbrough Women Football Club was formed in 1976. Originally known as Cleveland Spartans, they played in the Nottinghamshire Ladies League, and were coached by Middlesbrough players Mark Proctor and David Hodgson. The club reached the 1982 WFA Cup Final, losing 2–0 to Lowestoft. Middlesbrough later played in the Yorkshire and Humberside Ladies League.

In 1996 Marrie Wieczorek became full time manager. Under her guidance Middlesbrough won the 2001–02 Northern Combination, and were promoted to the FA Women's Premier League Northern Division. They remained in the Northern Division for four seasons, returning to the Northern Combination following relegation at the end of the 2005–06 season.

Ups and downs (2010–present)
In September 2010, Middlesbrough travelled to North Korea and played two friendly matches against April 25 SC, losing 6–2, and Kalmaegi, losing 5–0. In 2013 Gemma Grainger was appointed manager, and the club finished the 2012–13 season in fourth place.

As a result of the restructuring of the FA Women's Premier League for the 2014–15 season, Middlesbrough competed in the newly formed FA Women's Premier League Northern Division One. Under new manager and owner Lindsey Stephenson, the club finnished the season in fourth place. Middlesbrough won the 2015–16 Northern Division One, and were promoted to the Northern Premier Division. In their first season back in the third tier of woman's football, Middlesbrough achieved a second place finish. In June 2017 the club unveiled a new crest.

In January 2020, Ben Fisher was announced as new chairman, while Marrie Wieczorek returned to the club as an ambassador. Middlesbrough reached the semi-finals of the 2019–20 FA Women's National League Plate, losing 2–0 to Watford. On 24 August 2021, former Middlesbrough player Andy Campbell was appointed manager. Middlesbrough were relegated to the National League Division One North at the end of the 2021–22 season.

Kits

Kit suppliers and shirt sponsors

Stadium
Middlesbrough spent ten years playing home games at Teesdale Park, Thornaby. In July 2018, the club moved to Bedford Terrace, Billingham. Since June 2022, Middlesbrough have played their home games at Bishopton Road West, Stockton.

The stadium underwent a £1 million redevelopment in 2015, and now includes modern facilities and a 3G pitch.

Players

Current squad

Reserves
Middlesbrough operate a reserve team who compete in the FA Women's National League Reserve Northern Division, and play home games at Middlesbrough College. The club also operate a development team, who play in the North Riding Women's Premier League.

Former players

Club staff
.

Managerial history

Honours

League
 Northern Combination Women's Football League
 Winners (1): 2001–02

 FA Women's National League Division One North
 Winners (1): 2015–16

References

External links
Official website

Women's football clubs in England
Football clubs in North Yorkshire
Association football clubs established in 1976
1976 establishments in England
FA Women's National League teams